Ugly Planet is a music culture magazine dedicated to documenting artists who support innovation, diversity, equality, justice, and social introspection. The magazine seeks artists (regardless of genre) who endeavor to enlighten or engender political or social change.

References

External links
 Official website

Music magazines published in the United States
Magazines with year of establishment missing